Niniwa Heremaia or Niniwa-i-te-rangi (6 Apr 1854 – 23 Mar 1929) was a Maori leader in New Zealand.

In 1898 during Parliament's Native Affairs Committee inquiry into Maori land legislation, she was the only woman to give evidence.  She was involved with the formation of several newspapers. The Te Puke ki Hikurangi and Te Tiupiri published in Maori and the Maori Record, an English-language paper for Maori advancement.

References

1854 births
1929 deaths
Māori activists
People from Greytown, New Zealand
New Zealand women activists